Jeon Ga-eul (or  ; born 14 September 1988) is a South Korean footballer who plays for Sejong Sportstoto in the WK League. She was the first South Korean to play in the US National Women's Soccer League, and the Australian W-League. She has won numerous domestic league titles, individual MVP titles and international competitions, being the leading scorer in the national team side that won the Women's gold medal in football at the 2009 Summer Universiade. Jeon scored notable braces against Germany in the group stages, and against Japan in the Final. She also scored six goals in one match against South Africa. Overall, she made over 100 appearances for the South Korean national team.

Club career

Western New York Flash
On 1 January 2016, the National Women's Soccer League club Western New York Flash announced the signing of Jeon for the 2016 season, making her the first player from South Korea to play in the league.

She was released by the Flash on 13 June 2016.

Melbourne Victory
On 25 October 2017, Jeon signed with Melbourne Victory, becoming the first South Korean player to join the W-League. On 3 November 2017, she made her debut in a 1–0 loss to Melbourne City. On 9 December 2017, she scored her first goal in a 4–0 win over Adelaide United. She finished the 2017–18 season with one goal in ten appearances.

Hwacheon KSPO
In February 2018, Jeon signed with Hwacheon KSPO. On 23 April 2018, she scored on her debut in a 3–0 home victory against Boeun Sangmu.

Bristol City
Jeon Ga-eul was announced as a new signing by Bristol City of the FA WSL on 18 January 2020. Jeon made her Bristol City debut on 26 January 2020 in their Women's FA Cup fourth round victory against Durham. Due to fixture cancellations caused by bad weather, Jeon's FA WSL debut came on 12 February 2020 away at league leaders Manchester City. She received praise in the sporting press for her performance with sports website Vavel saying, "The 31-year-old played in the number 10 role in Manchester and looked like a real leader with her vast experience at international level and in the W-League shining through. The Robins' number 14 worked her socks off at both ends of the field and was encouraging her teammates every time the ball went out of play."

Reading
Having been released by Bristol at the end of the 2019–20 season, Jeon returned to the WSL by signing for Reading at the start of the 2020–21 season. She made her Reading debut on 4 October 2020, coming on as an 80th minute substitute in their 1–0 away win at West Ham. She made her starting XI debut on 7 October 2020 in Reading's 4–0 home win over Charlton in the FA Women's League Cup. A long-term injury sustained later that month meant she made just four appearances for Reading during the 2020–21 season. After playing only two games in the first half of the 2021–22 season, Jeon left Reading in December 2021.

International career
Jeon was a member of the under-17 team that finished fourth at the 2005 AFC U-17 Women's Championship, where she scored four goals in five appearances. On 12 August 2007, she made her senior debut in a 2–1 victory against Vietnam, before returning to the under-19 team to play at the 2007 AFC U-19 Women's Championship, where South Korea finished fourth. In 2008, she was called up to represent South Korea at the 2008 EAFF Women's Football Championship, at the 2008 AFC Women's Asian Cup and at the 2008 Peace Queen Cup. In 2009, she helped South Korea win gold at the 2009 Summer Universiade, finishing as the top scorer of the tournament with 10 goals. The following year, she scored the game-winning goal against Australia in the 2010 Peace Queen Cup final and was named the tournament's MVP. She was also part of the team that won bronze at the 2010 Asian Games and finished third at the 2010 EAFF Women's Football Championship. However, South Korea finished third in group B at the 2010 AFC Women's Asian Cup and failed to qualify for the World Cup. At the 2014 AFC Women's Asian Cup, she scored three goals in 5 appearances as South Korea qualified for the World Cup for the first time since 2003. She won another bronze medal at the 2014 Asian Games, where she scored six goals. In 2015, she helped South Korea finish second at the 2015 EAFF Women's East Asian Cup and at the 2015 Four Nations Tournament. Jeon played all four of South Korea's matches at the 2015 FIFA Women's World Cup, scoring a goal in a 2–2 draw with Costa Rica on 13 June 2015.

Career statistics

Club

International
Scores and results list South Korea's goal tally first, score column indicates score after each Jeon goal.

Honours

Club
Suwon FMC
 WK League: 2010

Incheon Hyundai Steel Red Angels
 WK League: 2013, 2014, 2015, 2017

International
 Summer Universiade: 2009
 Peace Queen Cup: 2010

Individual
 Summer Universiade Top Scorer: 2009
 Peace Queen Cup MVP: 2010
 WK League MVP: 2010

References

External links
 

1988 births
Living people
People from Paju
South Korean women's footballers
Women's association football forwards
Women's association football midfielders
South Korea women's under-17 international footballers
South Korea women's under-20 international footballers
South Korea women's international footballers
South Korean expatriate footballers
Suwon FC Women players
Incheon Hyundai Steel Red Angels WFC players
WK League players
Expatriate women's soccer players in the United States
Expatriate women's soccer players in Australia
Expatriate women's footballers in England
South Korean expatriate sportspeople in the United States
South Korean expatriate sportspeople in Australia
South Korean expatriate sportspeople in England
Footballers at the 2010 Asian Games
Footballers at the 2014 Asian Games
Footballers at the 2018 Asian Games
2015 FIFA Women's World Cup players
Asian Games medalists in football
Western New York Flash players
Melbourne Victory FC (A-League Women) players
Bristol City W.F.C. players
Reading F.C. Women players
Women's Super League players
National Women's Soccer League players
Asian Games bronze medalists for South Korea
Medalists at the 2010 Asian Games
Medalists at the 2014 Asian Games
Medalists at the 2018 Asian Games
FIFA Century Club
Universiade gold medalists for South Korea
Universiade medalists in football
Medalists at the 2009 Summer Universiade